Captain Charles George Douglas Napier,  (1892 – 15 May 1918) was a British World War I flying ace credited with nine aerial victories before being killed in action.

Biography
Napier was born in Shepherd's Bush, London, England in 1892. Before the war he was employed in the Fire Department of the Employers' Liability Assurance Corporation Ltd.

Army service
He began his military service as a private in the Army Cyclist Corps. In August 1915, while serving as a corporal in the 47th Divisional Cyclist Company, Napier was awarded the Distinguished Conduct Medal. His citation read:

On 24 February 1916 he received the Médaille militaire from France "in recognition of ... distinguished service during the campaign".

Royal Flying Corps service

Napier was seconded to the Royal Flying Corps, and commissioned as a temporary second lieutenant on 23 September 1917. He served with No. 20 Squadron in late 1917 before transferring to 48 Squadron in early 1918. He scored his first aerial victory while with them, on 7 February. On 4 April he was promoted to acting-captain. He would run his total to nine wins, rounding off his tally with a triple victory on 9 May; he and his gunner Walter Beales were also shot down during this action, though without injury. Six days later, he was killed in action, shot down along with his gunner of the day. On 12 June, the Germans verified Napier's death. Ten days later, his award of the Military Cross was gazetted, as follows:

Notes

References
 
 

1892 births
1918 deaths
People from Shepherd's Bush
Military personnel from London
British Army personnel of World War I
Royal Flying Corps officers
British World War I flying aces
British military personnel killed in World War I
Aviators killed by being shot down
Recipients of the Distinguished Conduct Medal
Recipients of the Military Cross
Army Cyclist Corps soldiers
Royal Air Force personnel of World War I
Royal Air Force officers